José Mário Vaz (born 10 December 1957) is a Bissau-Guinean politician who served as president of Guinea-Bissau from 23 June 2014 to 27 February 2020.

Life and career
Popularly known by the nickname "Jomav," José Mário Vaz was born in 1957 to Mário Vaz and Amelia Gomes in Calequisse, outside the city of Cacheu in northern Guinea-Bissau. He is married and has three children. He graduated as an economist in Lisbon and did an internship at the Office of Economic Studies of the Banco de Portugal in 1982. In 2004, he was elected as mayor of Bissau, a position he held until 2009, when he was named by President Malam Bacai Sanhá as minister of finance. He and the other ministers were ousted in the 2012 Guinea-Bissau coup d'etat.

Vaz is a member of the African Party for the Independence of Guinea and Cape Verde and won the right to represent the party in the 2014 presidential election by besting eleven hopefuls during a two-day primary in March 2014.

In the first round of the election, held on 13 April 2014, Vaz won 40.9% of the votes, and entered a runoff with the second leading vote-getter, Nuno Gomes Nabiam, who was backed by the military. In the second round, on 18 May 2014, he received 61.9% of the vote. Though Gomes Nabiam initially contested the result, he conceded the election on 22 May 2014.

During the election, Vaz promised to focus on reducing poverty and increasing investment in agriculture, as well as forgiveness for participation in the sorts of criminal activities that have turned Guinea-Bissau into a haven for drug traffickers. After the 2012 coup, he fled to Portugal, but returned in February 2013 and spent three days under arrest. He was accused of being involved in the disappearance of €9.1 million in aid donated to the country by Angola, a charge he denies, and it remains unclear if the donation was ever sent.

Vaz has the peculiarity of being the only president of Guinea-Bissau since independence to be able to finish his five-year term.

On June 27, 2019, four days after the end of his term, he was replaced by the president of the National People's Assembly, Cipriano Cassamá, who until the November elections remained as acting president. On 29 June, ECOWAS decided that Vaz would stay in office until after the 2019 elections.

Vaz ran as an independent in the 2019 elections but received only 12% of the vote in the first round and failed to advance to the second round.

See also
 Politics of Guinea-Bissau

References

1957 births
African Party for the Independence of Guinea and Cape Verde politicians
Bissau-Guinean Roman Catholics
Government ministers of Guinea-Bissau
Living people
Mayors of Bissau
People from Cacheu Region
Presidents of Guinea-Bissau
Corruption in Guinea-Bissau
2012 in Guinea-Bissau
Economic Community of West African States
Corruption in Angola